Streptomyces monashensis is a bacterium species from the genus of Streptomyces which has been isolated from mangrove soil from Sarawak.

See also 
 List of Streptomyces species

References 

monashensis
Bacteria described in 2019